= Villa Zambonina =

The Villa Zambonina is a historic villa in Verona, Italy. It was completed in 1706.
